The British Museum Quarterly was a peer-reviewed academic journal published by the British Museum. It described recent acquisitions and research concerning the museum's collections and was published from 1926 to 1973. It is available electronically from JSTOR.

References
British Museum Quarterly - JSTOR

Visual art journals
Publications established in 1926
Publications disestablished in 1973
English-language journals
Defunct journals of the United Kingdom
Quarterly journals
1926 establishments in the United Kingdom
1973 disestablishments in the United Kingdom
Quarterly
Academic journals published by museums